The Early Years 79–81 is a five-disc box set by the English rock group Def Leppard, released by UMC on 20 March 2020. The set includes remastered versions of the band's first two studio albums: On Through the Night (originally released in 1980) and High 'n' Dry (originally released in 1981), plus songs from the band's 1979 EP, a complete live concert recording from 1980, and a variety of B-sides, studio outtakes, and BBC Radio appearances from the band's formative period between 1979 and 1981.

Background
In late 2019, Def Leppard announced the impending release of a collection of material from their formative years, to include the first ever official live recordings featuring guitarist Pete Willis, who left the band in 1982. The release coincided with the 40th anniversary of their debut album On Through the Night. The box set collects material from the period in which Def Leppard was considered a leading band in the New Wave of British Heavy Metal.

The collection was curated by singer Joe Elliott, with remastering overseen by the band's longtime sound engineer Ronan McHugh. The physical release includes a history written by Classic Rock writer Paul Elliott plus personal messages from the band, rare photos, and memorabilia.

The 1980 live set was recorded at the New Theatre in Oxford, and had never before been released. Included among the early songs recorded live in 1980 are "When the Rain Falls", which was later re-written as "Let It Go" for the High 'n' Dry album, and "Medicine Man" which became "Rock! Rock! (Till You Drop)" on the band's 1983 album Pyromania. The live recordings were not edited in any fashion.

Also included are remixes of "Bringin' On the Heartbreak" and "Me and My Wine" that were added to a 1984 reissue of High 'n' Dry, and an early version of "Rock Brigade" produced by Nick Tauber that was intended as a British single but never released.

Reception
According to AllMusic, "The Early Years 79–81 set captures Def Leppard as they burst onto the scene and quickly refined their sound into something millions of people couldn't get enough of," and that the box set is "interesting enough historically, and it's definitely worth it to true Def Lep devotees." Spectrum Culture called the box set "an effective introduction to the uninitiated, charting the giddy origins from which the Sheffield stalwarts rocketed to stadium-conquering heights," and "a compulsory addition to the collection of any seasoned Def Leppard follower."

Track listing

Personnel 
 Joe Elliott – lead vocals
 Steve Clark – lead and rhythm guitars, backing vocals
 Pete Willis – lead and rhythm guitars, backing vocals
 Rick Savage – bass, backing vocals
 Rick Allen – drums
 Frank Noon – drums on 1979 EP tracks

References

Def Leppard compilation albums
Def Leppard live albums
2020 compilation albums
2020 live albums
BBC Radio recordings
Virgin EMI Records albums